Salagena ngazidya is a moth in the family Cossidae. It is found on the Comoros.

References

Natural History Museum Lepidoptera generic names catalog

Metarbelinae
Moths described in 1981